Kjell Albin Abrahamson (23 June 1945 – 22 September 2016) was a Swedish journalist and author. He served as Swedish National Radio's senior correspondent to Warsaw, Poland, a position he previously held in Moscow, USSR (1986–1990); twice in Vienna, Austria (1990–1994 and 2001–2004); and once before in Warsaw (1994–1997). He also wrote for Sydsvenska Dagbladet and op-ed pieces for Länstidningen of Östersund.

Abrahamson has written a number of initiated books about the transitional characteristics of Eastern Europe and Russia. After the assassination of the Russian journalist Anna Politkovskaya, Abrahamson blamed the Russian President Vladimir Putin, naming him "Gasputin" (an obvious mockery of the president, Gazprom, and the Russian mystic Grigori Rasputin), concluding: "With oil and gas, (Putin) has succeeded, where the Soviet Union - despite having nuclear weapons - failed".

Abrahamson suffered a stroke and died in Gdynia, Poland on 22 September 2016.

Selected bibliography 
Munkavlen och ordet : [Polen 81] = [Knebel i slowo] : [Polska 81], Göteborg : Maneten, 1981.  
Från stormakt till Big Mac : oväsentligheter om Sovjetunionen, Stockholm : Norstedt, 1991. 
Fakta om Tjeckien och Slovakien, Stockholm : Almqvist & Wiksell, 1994. 
Balkan betyder berg : [reporter i krigets Jugoslavien], Stockholm : Fischer, 1995. 
Fakta om Österrike och Schweiz, Stockholm : Almqvist & Wiksell, 1996. 
Polen - diamant i aska (Polska - diament w popiele), Stockholm : Fischer, 1997.  
Sverige och Polen : Szwecja i Polska, Stockholm : Svenska institutet, 2000.  
Den harmynte humoristen, Stockholm : Fischer, 2002.  
Enkel biljett till Polen, Rimbo : Fischer & Co, 2004.

References

1945 births
2016 deaths
People from Krokom Municipality
20th-century Swedish journalists
21st-century Swedish journalists